Beatrice Gumulya (born 1 January 1991) is an Indonesian tennis player.

Career
She is the younger sister of Sandy Gumulya and made her debut as a professional in 2005, aged 14, at an ITF tournament in Jakarta.

She enjoyed some success in Grand Slam junior championships. In 2008, she and partner Jessy Rompies reached the semifinals of the Junior US Open doubles competition. She also reached the semifinals in the 2009 Junior Australian Open doubles tournament, this time partnered by Noppawan Lertcheewakarn of Thailand. She enrolled in Clemson University in Fall 2011, studying PRTM and playing for the Clemson tennis team. In 2016, she represented Indonesia in the Fed Cup for the first time.

ITF Circuit finals

Singles: 1 (1 title)

Doubles: 23 (15 titles, 8 runner-ups)

ITF Junior finals

Doubles

National representation

Singles: 2 (1 gold, 1 bronze)

Doubles: 1 (gold medal)

Mixed doubles: 1 (bronze)

External links
 
 
 

1991 births
Living people
Sportspeople from Jakarta
Indonesian female tennis players
Tennis players at the 2018 Asian Games
Asian Games competitors for Indonesia
Competitors at the 2019 Southeast Asian Games
Southeast Asian Games gold medalists for Indonesia
Southeast Asian Games bronze medalists for Indonesia
Southeast Asian Games medalists in tennis
Universiade bronze medalists for Indonesia
Universiade medalists in tennis
Medalists at the 2015 Summer Universiade
Competitors at the 2021 Southeast Asian Games
21st-century Indonesian women
Clemson Tigers women's tennis players